Ambrosiu Dimitrovici (July 20, 1838 in Chernivtsi – July 3/15, 1866 in Chernivtsi) was a Romanian publisher.  He was one of the founding members of the Romanian Academy.

References 

1838 births
1866 deaths
Businesspeople from Chernivtsi
Romanian publishers (people)
Founding members of the Romanian Academy